Eight ships of the Royal Netherlands Navy have been named HNLMS De Zeven Provinciën or similar, after the original seven provinces of the Netherlands forming the Union of Utrecht and signing the Act of Abjuration (declaration of independence):

 , ship of the line of the Amsterdam Admiralty;
 , ship of the line (1665–1694), of the Maze Admiralty;
 , ship of the line of the Maze Admiralty;
 , ship of the line of the Noorderkwartier Admiralty;
  – a coastal defence ship in service from 1910 to 1942;
  (1950–1976), ;
  (2002– ), the lead ship of the s.

See also
 , ship of the line of the Amsterdam Admiralty;

References

Royal Netherlands Navy ship names